The Best of Roald Dahl is a collection of 25 of Roald Dahl's short stories. The first edition was published in 1978.

Contents
Madame Rosette
Man from the South
The Sound Machine
Taste
Dip in the Pool
Skin
Edward the Conqueror
Lamb to the Slaughter
Galloping Foxley
The Way Up to Heaven
Parson's Pleasure
The Landlady
William and Mary
Mrs. Bixby and the Colonel's Coat
Royal Jelly
Georgy Porgy
Genesis and Catastrophe
Pig
The Visitor
Claud's Dog (The Ratcatcher, Rummins, Mr. Hoddy, Mr. Feasy, Champion of the World)
The Great Switcheroo
The Boy Who Talked with Animals
The Hitchhiker
The Wonderful Story of Henry Sugar
The Bookseller

References

1978 short story collections
Short story collections by Roald Dahl